Subantarctic red-crowned parakeet may refer to:

 Macquarie parakeet
 Reischek's parakeet

Animal common name disambiguation pages